Runnelstone Rock is a rock lying at the southwest end of Grandidier Channel, 3 nautical miles (6 km) northwest of Larrouy Island and 16 nautical miles (30 km) west-southwest of Cape Garcia, Graham Land. Charted by the British Graham Land Expedition (BGLE) in 1935–36 and named after the Runnel Stone off Gwennap Head, Cornwall, England.
 

Rock formations of Graham Land
Graham Coast